Liu Bolin (born 7 January 1973) is a contemporary concealment artist born in China's Shandong province. He earned his Bachelor of Fine Arts from the Shandong College of Arts in 1995 and his Master of Fine Arts from the Central Academy of Fine Arts in Beijing in 2001. His work has been exhibited in museums around the world. Also known as "the invisible man", Liu's most popular works are from his "Hiding in the City" series, photographic works that began as performance art in 2005 in response to the artists' village in which he worked in Beijing being demolished in preparation for the 2008 Beijing Olympics.

Liu belongs to the generation that came of age in the early 1990s, when China emerged from the rubble of the Cultural Revolution and was beginning to enjoy rapid economic growth and relative political stability.

Since his first solo shows in Beijing in 1998, Liu's work has received international recognition. Among other international venues, his distinctive photographs and sculptures have been shown at the major contemporary photography festival Les Rencontres d'Arles and he had solo shows at Dashanzi Art Zone in Beijing (2007), Galerie Bertin-Toublanc in Paris (2007), Klein Sun Gallery in New York (2008), Galerie Paris-Beijing in Paris and Brussels (2013), Boxart Gallery in Verona (2008), Forma Foundation for Photography in Milan (2010), H. C. Andersen Museum in Rome (2012).

To celebrate US President Obama's visit to China, he made an effigy of Obama in his honor.

He now lives and works in Beijing, China.

In June 2011, Liu created his Hiding in New York series, in which he incorporated iconic New York sites into his work.

In January 2013, Liu created the artwork for New Jersey hard rock band Bon Jovi's 2013 album What About Now.

Series

Hiding in the City

Liu was moved to create his "Hiding in the City" series after the destruction of the Beijing artists' village Suo Jia Cun in November 2005. At the time of the destruction, Liu had been working in Suo Jia Cun, previously given the title of Asia's largest congregation of artists. Prompted by his emotional response to the demolition of this site, Liu decided to use his art as a means of silent protest, calling attention to the lack of protection Chinese artists had received from their own government. Through the use of his own body in his practice of painting himself into various settings in Beijing, Liu created a space for Chinese artists, preserving their social status and highlighting their often troubled relationship with their physical surroundings.

In his work, Liu has always given special attention to the various social problems that accompany China's rapid economic development, making social politics the crux of his pictorial commentaries. In "Hiding in the City", Liu made one of his particular focuses slogans as an educational tool used within Communist societies, pointing out that many people would become used to the slogans over time and cease to pay conscious attention to the messages' effects on the public's thinking. By painting his body into some such slogans, Liu forces the viewer to acknowledge the messages and, in the process, to reconsider the circumstances of one's own life.

The "Hiding in the City" series has inspired similar subsequent series by Liu Bolin. In particular, "Shadow" draws on the same concept of the helplessness of the individual; however, instead of taking the individual in the face of society as its focal point, "Shadow" explores the relationship of the individual to its natural environment. Rather than painting himself into the background of various man-made structures, as he did in "Hiding in the City", here Liu lay on surfaces during periods of rain, keeping the space directly below his body dry. The flat human figure created by his presence always quickly disappeared when Liu moved away, demonstrating the extent to which humans are helpless before their environment. (The British artist Andrew Goldsworthy has also used the same technique, albeit in a natural environment.)

Liu Bolin followed up his Beijing series of "Hiding in the City" with two derivative series of performances captured in Venice, Milan, Rome, Pompeii, Verona and New York City. Following the method of painting himself into the cityscapes, Liu chose Italy for its significance within the Western art tradition and New York City for the potency of the underlying conflicts between humans and the objects they create. The first derivative series, on going since 2008, was titled "Hiding in Italy" and was collected into the solo exhibition "Liu Bolin. A Secret Tour", at H. C. Andersen Museum in Rome, curated by Raffaele Gavarro in 2012. In service to this project, Liu painted himself into such socially-loaded backgrounds as Wall Street and the Tiles for America 9/11 memorial.

In February 2012, a collaborative project was announced between Liu Bolin and designers Gaultier, Valentino, Lanvin and Missoni that was featured in the March 2012 issue of Harper's Bazaar magazine. Following the success of his series of works camouflaging prominent people into backgrounds, he collaborated with the French art star JR. He was also featured as a prominent artist in a Newsweek profile titled Eli Klein on Riding the Wave of China's Contemporary Art Scene.

On the South Pier, at the Port of Catania, is recovered aground the first boat that in 2013 carried migrants from Africa to the coasts of Catania. Among them, six children Egyptians, exhausted for the trip on that vessel, were tragically drowned trying to reach the seashore, a few meters far from the Lido Beach Green (Lido Verde). The artist chose to merge his body with the wreck and the history of which he is a silent witness for his first shot of the MIGRANTS project, dated 2015. The scenario of the tragedy evoked by the first work, the Lido Verde, provides the second background to the Liu Bolin's photographic project. "Being immigrants lying on the sand," says the artist, "for someone they may seem dead; instead my intent is to describe their arrival and the start of their future."

Compared to the most famous and longest-running series Hiding in the City, where Liu Bolin is the focus of the photographic subject, the evolution of his shots called Target series provides for the disappearance of more people in the context, in line with the content. The whole series has been followed by Corriere della Sera and TGCOM24.

Exhibition history

Solo exhibitions
 2018: "Le théâtre des apparences", Musée de l'Élysée, Switzerland.
 2014: "Liu Bolin: Fade in Italy," Boxart, Verona, Italy
 2013: Liu Bolin, Galerie Paris-Beijing, Paris, France
 2012: "Liu Bolin. A Secret Tour", Museo H.C. Andersen, Rome, Italy
 2012: "Liu Bolin: Hide in the City," Multimedia Art Museum Moscow
 2011: Hiding in the City, Galerie Paris-Beijing, Beijing, China
 2011: The Invisible Man, Klein Sun Gallery, New York, NY
 2011: The Invisible Man, Vänermuseet, Lidköping, Sweden
 2011: The Invisible Man, Fotografiska Stockholm, Sweden
 2011: "Hiding in Italy," Forma Centro Internazionale Di Fotografia, Milano, Italy
 2010: Hiding in the City, Museo de Bellas Artes, Caracas, Venezuela
 2010: Sunshine International Art Museum, Songzhuang, Beijing, China
 2010: On Fire, Klein Sun Gallery, New York, NY
 2008: "Hide and Seek," Boxart, Verona, Italy
 2008: China Report 2007, Klein Sun Gallery, New York, NY
 2007: Sculpture, Dashanzi Art Zone, Beijing, China
 2007: Distortion, Dashanzi Art Zone, Beijing, China
 1998: Haiyang Works Exhibition, Yantai, China

Group exhibitions 
 2015: Interact: Deconstructing Spectatorship: East Wing Biennial, The Courtauld Institute of Art, London, England (with a. o. Sebastian Brajkovic, Matthew Buckingham, Pablo Delgado, Petra Feriancova, Felix Gonzalez-Torres, Dieter Jung, Donald Martiny, Julie Mehretu, Katie Paterson, Bridget Riley, Regina Silveira, Marc Quinn, Shezad Dawood)
 2011: Fotográfica Biennale, Museo de Fotografía, Bogotá, Colombia
 2011: Black and White, Zero Field Art Center, Beijing, China
 2010: The Right to Protest, Museum on the Seam, Jerusalem, Israel
 2010: Reflection of Minds. Shanghai MoCA, Shanghai, China
 2010: Passing China, Sanatorium, Istanbul, Turkey
 2010: HomeLessHome, Museum on the Seam, Jerusalem, Israel
 2010: Armed & Dangerous: Art of the Arsenal, Berkshire Museum, Pittsfield, MA
 2009-10: Animamix Biennial, Shanghai MoCA, Shanghai, China; Today Art Museum, Beijing, China; Guangdong Museum of Art, Guangzhou, China
 2009: Shore – Contemporary Academy Sculpture Exhibition, Moon River Art Museum, Beijing, China
 2009: Blank – Making China, Zhongjian Art Museum, Beijing, China
 2009: International Contemporary Art Invitational Exhibition, Seoul Art Museum, Seoul, Korea
 2009: Erotic – Contemporary Art Invitational Exhibition, Dadi Rui City Exhibition Center, Jinan, China
 2009: The Big World: Recent Art from China, Chicago Cultural Center, Chicago, USA
 2009: Passing By China, Klein Sun Gallery, New York, NY
 2009: Camouflage, La Casa Encendida, Madrid, Spain
 2008: Mixed Maze – Group Photography Exhibition, Red Mansion Foundation, London, UK
 2008: New Middle Kingdom, Royal Liver Building, Liverpool, UK
 2008: Live, Galerie Adler, Paris, France
 2008: Force-Form, International Contemporary Art Exhibition, Bridge Art Center, Beijing, China
 2008: Sunshine International Art Museum, Songzhuang, Beijing, China
 2007: Olympic Landscape Sculpture Exhibition, Beijing, China
 2007: Les Rencontres d'Arles, Arles, France
 2007: Made in China - Chinese Contemporary Art, Shanghai Duolun Museum of Modern Art, Shanghai, China
 2007: Union - Exhibition of Chinese and Chile Artists, No. 1 China Art Base, Beijing, China
 2007: Union in June, Chinese Performance Art Exhibition, Songzhuang, Beijing, China
 2007: Resettling -  Suo Jia Village Modern Art Exhibition, Beijing International Arts Camp II Ka Tsuen, Beijing, China
 2007: The First 'Breathing' - Shandong Modern Art Exhibition, Shandong Museum,  Shandong, China
 2006: Songzhuang Art Festival, Songzhuang Art Zone, Beijing, China
 2006: Qingzhou International Contemporary Art Exhibition, Qingzhou Museum,  Shandong, China
 2006: Third Contemporary Art Exhibition, Sunshine International Museum, Beijing, China
 2006: Contemporary Art Exhibition of Dismantle, Xiyuantianlu Business Hotel, Beijing, China
 2005: Beijing Calligraphy Exhibition Maside Art Center, Beijing, China
 2005: Lead Times, Chang Chau Chinese Contemporary Sculpture Exhibition, Tianjin Harbor Plaza, Tianjin, China
 2005: Di-Di-Dismantle, Beijing International Arts Camp II Ka Tsuen, Beijing, China
 2005: Considerable, West Lake International Sculpture Exhibition, Hangzhou Fine Art  Museum, Hangzhou, China
 2001: "The Second Invitational Sculpture Exhibition of Contemporary Young Sculptors," Hangzhou Fine Art Museum, Hangzhou, China
 2001: Works Exhibition The First China Sculpture Competition, China
 2000: The Second Metals Work Exhibition, Central Academy of Fine Arts, Beijing, China

Publications 
 Liu Bolin, A Secret Tour, with texts by Matilde Amaturo, Raffaele Gavarro, Maretti Editore, 2012. 
 Liu Bolin, Thircuir Books, 2012.  
 Liu Bolin, Hiding in Italy, with texts by Beatrice Benedetti and Nicola Ricciardi, Shin Productions, Brescia, 2010.

References

External links

 Boxart Galleria d'Arte
 Klein Sun Gallery
 Thircuir Books
 

1973 births
Living people
Central Academy of Fine Arts alumni
Artists from Shandong
Chinese photographers